The 1966–67 season was Blackpool F.C.'s 59th season (56th consecutive) in the Football League. They competed in the 22-team Division One, then the top tier of English football, finishing bottom. As a result, they were relegated to Division Two.

After eight seasons in charge, Ron Suart resigned as manager in January. He was replaced by former player Stan Mortensen.

Ray Charnley was the club's top scorer for the ninth consecutive season, with 21 goals (fourteen in the league, one in the FA Cup and six in the League Cup).

Table

Notes

References

Blackpool F.C. seasons
Blackpool